Newsome Sinks Karst Area is a privately owned karst formation in Morgan County, Alabama.  It was listed as a National Natural Landmark in November 1973.

Description
The valley was named for William Newsome who settled in the area in 1838. The land is part of the Cotaco Creek watershed. The underlying rock is Bangor Limestone formed in the Mississippian Age.

There are over 15 rare species in the area, such as the southern cavefish, gray bat, Indiana bat, American Hart's-tongue fern and Tennessee bladderfern.

During the American Civil War, saltpeter was mined to make gunpowder here, and the Confederates had a leather tanning operation until it was destroyed by Union forces.

References

External links
Newsome Sinks Karst Area
Plants found in the area

National Natural Landmarks in Alabama
Protected areas of Morgan County, Alabama
Karst caves